Christoph Stückler (born 27 May 1980) is a former Austrian defender.

References

1980 births
Living people
Austrian footballers
Association football defenders
SC Austria Lustenau players
SC Rheindorf Altach players